Noknoi Uraiporn (b. 11 October 1957 —) is a famous Thai Luk thung and Mor lam singer. She is the leader of Mor lam band, Sieang Isan (เสียงอีสาน). She has many popular songs including "Nok Jaa", "Loei Wela Kid Hid", "Mon Phleng Sieng Isan", "Phab Tay Winyan Rak", etc.

Early life
Noknoi was born on 10 October 1957 in Sisaket Province and named Urai Sihawong at birth. She is the daughter of Som and Phan Sihawong.

Career
She started performing in 1970 in a contest. She appeared in many music contests, and often won. After that, she became popular and joined Mor lam band "Phetpinthong" presented by Nophadon Duangporn. In 1975, she released "Nok Ja" and took the stage name Noknoi Uraiporn.

She left Phetpinthong in 1975, and married Maiyakit Chimluang. After that, she founded a Mor Iam band by herself named Sieng Isan. This failed due to lack of performance in a show. She left music for 10 years. She then created another Mor lam band which became popular. It discovered many Mor lam singers including Poyfai Malaiporn, Saengaroon Boonyoo, Siriporn Ampaipong and Maithai Huajaising. She sang and wrote Mor lam songs, including "Mor lam Glon". Her band appeared around Thailand and other countries. She was called "Queen of Mor lam" of the 21st-century.

Debts 
She was charged with property fraud in 2019, because she was unable to repay debts totalling 3.8 million baht (or $125,000).

Awards
She received the 2016 "Hemaraj" award as an "Original Person in Culture".

Partial discography
 Nok Jaa
 Loei Wela Kid Hid
 Mon Phleng Sieng Isan
 Phab Tay Winyan Rak
BING CHILLING
SNP @timoovanne

References

1957 births
Living people
Noknoi Uraiporn
Noknoi Uraiporn
Noknoi Uraiporn
Noknoi Uraiporn